John Rankine (September 27, 1923 – July 25, 1996) was an American politician. He served as a Republican member of the Wyoming House of Representatives and the Wyoming Senate.

Life and career 
Rankine was born in Thermopolis, Wyoming, the son of Jeannie Anderson and Robert Rankine. He attended Washakie County High School.

In 1987, Rankine was elected to the Wyoming House of Representatives, serving until 1992. He was also elected to the Wyoming Senate, resigning in 1993.

Rankine died in July 1996, at the age of 72.

References 

1923 births
1996 deaths
People from Thermopolis, Wyoming
Republican Party members of the Wyoming House of Representatives
Republican Party Wyoming state senators
20th-century American politicians